The 1962 UC Santa Barbara Gauchos football team represented University of California, Santa Barbara (UCSB) during the 1962 NCAA College Division football season.

UCSB competed in the California Collegiate Athletic Association (CCAA), although 1962 was the last year they were in the conference. The team was led by third-year head coach Bill Hammer, and played home games at La Playa Stadium in Santa Barbara, California. They finished the season with a record of two wins and eight losses (2–8, 2–4 CCAA).

Schedule

Notes

References

UC Santa Barbara
UC Santa Barbara Gauchos football seasons
UC Santa Barbara Gauchos football